Baldi may refer to:

Baldi (surname)
Baldi (radio), a series of BBC radio detective dramas
Baldi's Basics in Education and Learning, a 2018 parody horror video game
Baldi's Basics Plus, a version of the above